The 1970 NBA All-Star Game was played at the Spectrum in Philadelphia, on January 20, 1970. Bob Rule was the replacement for the injured Nate Thurmond of the San Francisco Warriors. The MVP was Willis Reed. The coaches were Red Holzman (East), Richie Guerin (West). The game was broadcast by ABC, with Chris Schenkel and Jack Twyman commentating.

Team rosters

Eastern Conference

Western Conference

Score by periods
 

Officials: Richie Powers and Jack Madden
Attendance: 15,244.

References 

National Basketball Association All-Star Game
All-Star